Ricardo Guzmán Pereira Méndez (born 16 May 1991) is a Uruguayan footballer who currently plays for Montevideo Wanderers.

Honours

Club
Universidad de Chile
 Torneo Apertura: 2014
 Supercopa de Chile: 2015
 Copa Chile: 2015

Peñarol
Uruguayan Primera División: 2
 Uruguayan Primera División 2017, 2018

Individual
 Primera División Uruguaya Best Defensive Midfielder: 2013–14

References

External links
 

1991 births
Living people
Uruguayan footballers
Uruguayan expatriate footballers
Uruguay under-20 international footballers
Uruguay international footballers
Montevideo Wanderers F.C. players
Universidad de Chile footballers
Peñarol players
Uruguayan Primera División players
Chilean Primera División players
2015 Copa América players
Association football midfielders
Uruguayan expatriate sportspeople in Chile
Expatriate footballers in Chile